The Wailin' Jennys EP was the debut release from the eponymous Canadian folk trio. The lineup of the group at the time was Ruth Moody, Nicky Mehta, and Cara Luft; Luft has since left the group, being replaced first by Annabelle Chvostek and later by Heather Masse.

Track listing
"Come All You Sailors" 
"Deeper Well" 
"Sun's Gonna Rise" 
"Row Him Home" 
"Bring Me L'il Water, Silvy" 
"Bring 'Em All In"

2003 debut EPs
The Wailin' Jennys albums
Festival Distribution EPs
Red House Records albums